is a Japanese professional ice hockey defenceman currently playing for the Nippon Paper Cranes in the Asia League.

Yanadori has played for the Nippon Paper Cranes since 2009. He previously played at amateur level for the Komazawa Tomakomai team and for Meiji University. He has also played in the senior Japan national team since 2006.

External links
 Shinya Yanadori profile at Elite Prospects
 Cranes player profile

1986 births
People from Kushiro, Hokkaido
Japanese ice hockey defencemen
Living people
Sportspeople from Hokkaido
Asian Games gold medalists for Japan
Asian Games silver medalists for Japan
Medalists at the 2007 Asian Winter Games
Medalists at the 2011 Asian Winter Games
Ice hockey players at the 2007 Asian Winter Games
Ice hockey players at the 2011 Asian Winter Games
Asian Games medalists in ice hockey